The 1970 St. Louis Cardinals season was the 51st season the team was in the league. The team improved on their previous output of 4–9–1, winning eight games. Despite them shutting out three consecutive opponents (and holding a fourth, the defending Super Bowl champion Kansas City Chiefs, without a touchdown in a 6–6 draw), they failed to reach the playoffs for the 22nd straight season, thanks to three consecutive losses in December. The Cardinals entered their regular season finale at Washington needing to defeat the Redskins, plus for losses by the Cowboys (to the Oilers) and the Giants (to the Rams), to reach the playoffs. It all became academic after the Cardinals lost 28-27 to the Redskins and the Cowboys mauled the Oilers 52-10 to win the NFC East.

Prior to the season-ending skid, the Cardinals swept the Dallas Cowboys, with the second victory a 38–0 destruction on Monday Night Football at the Cotton Bowl. Dallas did not lose again until it fell to the Baltimore Colts in Super Bowl V. The Cardinals swept the Cowboys only one other time, in 1989, (one year after the Cardinals' relocation to Arizona), when Dallas went 1-15 under first-year coach Jimmy Johnson. (The Cardinals and Cowboys have not been division rivals since 2001, as the now-Arizona Cardinals were moved to the NFC West in 2002.)

Offseason

NFL Draft

Roster

Schedule

Standings

References 

1970
St. Louis Cardinals
St. Louis Cardinals (NFL)